Paglory University is a Christian private university of education, that is located in the city of Kabwe, within the Central Province of Zambia.

History
Paglory University was established in 1996 as Paglory College of Education.

It was upgraded to a university in 2016 by the Zambian Higher Education Authority.

Programs
Paglory University is affiliated with the University of Zambia for Secondary School Diploma Courses, and the Zambian Open University For Early Childhood Diploma Courses.

It is directed by Chancellor Prof. E. Machuta, and operated by the Paglory Ministries Int'l.

References

External links
 Paglory University; facebook

Universities in Zambia
Kabwe
Buildings and structures in Central Province, Zambia
Private schools in Zambia
Educational institutions established in 1996
1996 establishments in Zambia